Robert Douglas Coe (February 27, 1902 – May 26, 1985) was a career diplomat and the U.S. ambassador to Denmark from 1953 to 1957.

Early life
Coe was born on February 27, 1902.  He was the second son of William Robertson Coe and Mai Huttleston Rogers Coe. His siblings included banker and railroad executive William Rogers Coe, philanthropist Henry Huttleston Rogers Coe, and Natalie Mai Coe who became the Countess Vitetti after she married Commendatore Leonardo Vitetti, the Italian Ambassador to France.  

He attended St. Paul's School in Concord, New Hampshire. He later he received an A.B. in fine arts from Harvard University, and completed an M.A. at Magdalen College, Oxford, England.

Career
Although his father hoped young Robert would pursue a career in law or banking, he instead intended to become an architect, and took drawing lessons from Robert Chanler and Everett Shinn. His father William Robertson Coe was not fond of the idea of his son becoming an architect, and, ultimately, Bob became a career diplomat. 

Bob was posted to Brazil, Turkey, India, Great Britain, and the Netherlands, before serving as U.S. ambassador to Denmark from 1953 to 1957.

Diplomatic Service

Personal life
As a board member of the Planting Fields Foundation and Chairman of the Board between 1971 and 1985, he helped spark interest in the early restoration work at Coe Hall, particularly the Breakfast Room ("Buffalo Room") murals and the conservation of paintings and stained glass.

Robert painted as a hobby, and never married. Coe died on May 26, 1985.

References

External links

Robert Douglas Coe at the Planting Fields
Orlando Sentinel Obituary
The Political Graveyard: Robert Douglas Coe

Ambassadors of the United States to Denmark
1902 births
1985 deaths
Alumni of Magdalen College, Oxford
The Harvard Lampoon alumni
United States Foreign Service personnel